Rahul Chahal is a Canadian music video director and Music Composer associated with Punjabi-language music videos. He is owner of video-directing company called "TDOT FILMS". He has directed over 100 videos and worked with artists such as Sidhu Moose Wala, Garry Sandhu , Jassie Gill , Prem Dhillon , Happy Raikoti , R-Nait, Gurj Sidhu, Sajjan Adeeb, Jazim Sharma and The Landers.

Early life and career 
Chahal hailing from Toronto, Canada.
He made his debut in 2015 with "Currrency" song by Akash Aujla. He has directed Sidhu Moose Wala's Hits "Just Listen", "Doller" and "Jatt da muqabla", as well as he directed "Red Battiyan" by R-Nait, "Heart Patient" by The Landers.

References

External links
 
 

Canadian music video directors
Living people
1986 births